Tyler Glacier is a tributary glacier flowing southwest between Taylor Peak and Mount Francis to enter Tucker Glacier, in Victoria Land. Mapped by United States Geological Survey (USGS) from surveys and U.S. Navy air photos, 1960–62. Named by Advisory Committee on Antarctic Names (US-ACAN) for Lieutenant Paul E. Tyler, U.S. Navy, medical officer at Hallett Station, 1962.

Glaciers of Victoria Land
Borchgrevink Coast